Eirini Michail (born 12 July 2002) is a Cypriot footballer who plays as a midfielder for the Cyprus women's national team.

International career
Michail capped for Cyprus at senior level during the 2023 FIFA Women's World Cup qualification.

References

External links

2002 births
Living people
Cypriot women's footballers
Women's association football midfielders
Cyprus women's international footballers